Lonely Boy is a 1962 cinéma vérité documentary about the former teen sensation Paul Anka. The film takes its name from Anka's hit song, "Lonely Boy", which he performs to screaming fans in the film. This short documentary makes use of hand-held cameras to record intimate backstage moments. It was produced by the National Film Board of Canada and co-directed by Roman Kroitor and Wolf Koenig.

Influence 
Lonely Boy was a substantial influence on the Peter Watkins film Privilege. Watkins had studied it in preparation for filming and his film deals with the phenomenal popularity of a pop singer and its abuse for political motives. One scene showing the central character, Steven Shorter, at a table with a venue owner is virtually a one-to-one reproduction of a scene in Lonely Boy, even using the same name (Uncle Julie) for the like-mannered venue owner. The cinéma verité style of Lonely Boy was also adopted, and one DVD release of Privilege included Lonely Boy as well as an excerpt of an essay on that film as extra features. The film's importance in the evolution of documentary film making was explored in the film Cinéma Vérité: Defining the Moment.

Awards
 Festival dei Popoli, Florence, Italy: Gold Medal, 1960
 International Short Film Festival Oberhausen, Oberhausen, Germany: First Prize, Documentary, 1963
 15th Canadian Film Awards, Montreal: Film of the Year, 1963
 15th Canadian Film Awards, Montreal: Best Film, General Information, 1963
 Vancouver International Film Festival, Vancouver: First Prize, Documentary, 1962
 Ann Arbor Film Festival, Ann Arbor, Michigan: The Purchase Prize, 1963
International Days of Short Films, Tours, France: Special Jury Prize, 1962
 Edinburgh International Film Festival, Edinburgh, Scotland: Honorable Mention, 1962
 1962 Cannes Film Festival, Cannes, France: Honorable Mention, Documentary Works, 1962

References

External links
 
 
 Watch Lonely Boy at NFB.ca
 Media Rights entry

1962 short films
Canadian black-and-white films
English-language Canadian films
National Film Board of Canada documentaries
Documentary films about singers
Canadian short documentary films
Black-and-white documentary films
Best Picture Genie and Canadian Screen Award winners
1962 documentary films
Films directed by Roman Kroitor
National Film Board of Canada short films
Quebec films
1960s English-language films
1960s Canadian films
1960s short documentary films
English-language documentary films